Communicate is a monthly trade magazine for the UK corporate communications community. Communicate covers corporate communications, public relations, investor relations, internal communications, corporate social responsibility, crisis communications and public affairs.

With a monthly circulation of 10,000, it is read by in-house communications departments in the private and public sectors as well as communications consultancies and service providers across the UK.

In addition to the magazine, Communicate publishes a weekly e-newsletter and hosts a website of the same name.

Communicate magazine is published by Andrew Thomas, and edited by Brittany Golob. It is owned by Cravenhill Publishing, an independent publishing company based in London.

Columnists and contributors
Columnists and contributors have included: 
 Vikki Chowney, editor of Reputation Online
 Caroline Parry, former news editor of Marketing Week
 Rebecca Richmond, content director for internal communications training firm Melcrum Publishing
 Ruth Sunderland, associate city editor of Daily Mail

Each issue features a profile of a key figure in corporate communications. These have included:
Jane Wilson of the Chartered Institute of Public Relations, Andraea Dawson-Shepherd of Reckitt Benckiser and Simon Lewis when he was head of comms at 10 Downing Street.

Events division
Communicate organise a number of awards events and conferences on key areas of corporate communications. 

Their awards events include:
 The Digital Impact Awards, for digital corporate communications.
 The Transform Awards, for rebranding, repositioning and corporate transformation
 The Corporate Engagement Awards, for corporate partnerships and sponsorship 

Their conferences include:
 Social Media in a Corporate Context (held in London, Manchester and Amsterdam)
 Transform - the annual conference for rebranding
 Reputation in Financial Services
 Reputation in Oil, Gas and Mining

References

Business magazines published in the United Kingdom
Monthly magazines published in the United Kingdom
Magazines established in 2008
Professional and trade magazines
Magazines published in London